The name Amanda has been used for two tropical cyclones in the Eastern Pacific Ocean and two in the Southern Hemisphere. 

Eastern Pacific Ocean:
 Hurricane Amanda (2014), the strongest Eastern Pacific hurricane in the month of May. 
 Tropical Storm Amanda (2020), a short-lived tropical storm that made landfall in southeastern Guatemala. Its remnants spawned Tropical Storm Cristobal in the Gulf of Mexico.

South-West Indian Ocean:
 Cyclone Amanda (1963), stayed well out to sea to the east of Madagascar.
Australian region:
 Cyclone Amanda (1965), formed in the Arafura Sea and drifted across the Northern Territory and Western Australia.

See also
 Hurricane Amanda, an 1863 Atlantic storm which was retroactively given the same name.  

Pacific hurricane set index articles
South-West Indian Ocean cyclone set index articles
Australian region cyclone set index articles